The following list includes notable people who were born or have lived in Hinsdale, Illinois. For a similar list organized alphabetically by last name, see the category page People from Hinsdale, Illinois.

Authors and scientists 

 Ann Bannon (aka Ann Thayer or Weldy), author of lesbian pulp fiction (Odd Girl Out, I Am a Woman, Beebo Brinker): grew up in Hinsdale
 Paul Black, designer and writer of science fiction; born in Hinsdale
 David J. Foulis, mathematician and professor; born in Hinsdale
 Jay Freeman, known as saurik, creator of Cydia, the alternative to Apple's App Store
 Clark Kimberling, mathematician, musician, and composer; born in Hinsdale
 Eric Ludy, best-selling author, speaker and president of Ellerslie Mission Society
 Milan Mrksich, chemist, entrepreneur, professor, and Vice President for Research at Northwestern University; lives in Hinsdale
 Patrick Piemonte, computer scientist, inventor, and human interface designer; raised in Hinsdale

Acting 

 Danielle Campbell, actress (Starstruck, Prom, The Originals); native of Hinsdale
 Chris Klein, actor (American Pie I, II, & Reunion; We Were Soldiers); born in Hinsdale
 Heather McNair, actress (Automan)
 Meredith Monroe, actress (Andie McPhee on Dawson's Creek); grew up in Hinsdale
 Morris the Cat, animal actor (9Lives mascot); adopted from the Hinsdale Humane Society
 David Tom, actor (Stay Tuned, Swing Kids, The Young and the Restless); born in Hinsdale
 Heather Tom, actress (The Young and the Restless, The Bold and the Beautiful, One Life to Live); born in Hinsdale
 Nicholle Tom, actress (Maggie Sheffield on The Nanny); born in Hinsdale

Arts and culture 

 Tomi Adeyemi, novelist of fantasy series Legacy of Orïsha; raised in Hinsdale
 David Bohnett, technology pioneer, philanthropist, LGBT activist
 Mike Donovan, musician, raised in Hinsdale
 Loie Fuller, dancer
 Cynthia Hall, model
 Rob Johnson, CBS-2 newscaster
 Floyd Kalber, newscaster
 Taylor Mason, comedian
 Pete Nelson, host of Animal Planet show Treehouse Masters
 Joseph Nechvatal, visual artist 
 Bill Rancic, entrepreneur; reality TV personality (Giuliana & Bill; The Apprentice)
 Giuliana Rancic, host for E! News; reality TV personality (Giuliana & Bill)
 Dizzy Reed, keyboardist for Guns N' Roses 
 Allison Rosati, NBC-5 newscaster
 Rob Stafford, NBC-5 newscaster, lived in Hinsdale
 R. Harold Zook, architect

Business 

 Bob Dudley, Group CEO of BP

Politics and law 

 Valdas Adamkus, regional administrator of United States Environmental Protection Agency and the President of Lithuania (1998–2003, 2004–2009)
 Judy Biggert, United States congresswoman for Illinois's 13th congressional district (from 1999 to 2013)
 Robert William Dean, United States diplomat
 Kirk W. Dillard, candidate for governor of Illinois (2010)
 Goudyloch E. Dyer, Illinois state representative
 Pat Quinn, 41st governor of Illinois
 Jason Van Dyke, former Chicago police officer and convicted murderer
 Diane Wood, judge on the 7th Circuit Court of Appeals and professor at the University of Chicago Law School

Military
 Wilson Bryant Burtt, U.S. military officer

Sports

Baseball 

 Joe Benson, outfielder who is currently a free agent; born in Hinsdale
 Chuck Comiskey, co-owner of the Chicago White Sox; owned a taxi company in Hinsdale
 Bobby Thigpen, former Chicago White Sox pitcher; lived in Hinsdale
 Jim Thome, first baseman and designated hitter for six MLB teams; five-time All-Star; current special assistant to General Manager Rick Hahn of the Chicago White Sox; lived in Hinsdale
 Todd Van Poppel, pitcher for six MLB teams; born in Hinsdale
 Bill Veeck, baseball executive and franchise owner with MLB; grew up in Hinsdale

Basketball 

 Kathleen Doyle, basketball player at the University of Iowa (2016–2020); Big Ten Player of the Year in 2020. Also a silver medalist with the US national team at the 2019 Pan American Games. WNBA draftee as 14th overall pick by Indiana Fever. Born in Hinsdale.

Football 

 Jack Allen, center for the New Orleans Saints; born and raised in Hinsdale
 Brian Allen, offensive guard for the Los Angeles Rams; born and raised in Hinsdale 
 Jay Berwanger, first winner of the Heisman Trophy and first person ever chosen in the NFL draft; lived in Hinsdale many years
 Chuck Bradley, football player
 Kevin Kasper, wide receiver for nine NFL teams; Super Bowl champion (XXXIX); born in Hinsdale
 John Lynch, strong safety for the Tampa Bay Buccaneers, Denver Broncos, and New England Patriots; Super Bowl champion (XXXVII); born in Hinsdale
 Tom Rouen, punter for six NFL teams; born in Hinsdale
 Matt Sherry, tight end for the Cincinnati Bengals; born in Hinsdale

Hockey 

 Eric Daze, former left wing for the Chicago Blackhawks; lives in Hinsdale 
 Steve Konroyd, defenseman for six NHL teams; announcer for Comcast Sports; lived in Hinsdale
 Martin Lapointe, right wing for the Detroit Red Wings, Boston Bruins, Chicago Blackhawks, and Ottawa Senators; two-time winner of the Stanley Cup (1997-1998); lived in Hinsdale
 Josh Manson, defenseman for the Colorado Avalanche; born in Hinsdale
 Joel Quenneville, former head coach of the Chicago Blackhawks
 Brent Sopel, defenseman in the Kontinental Hockey League (KHL); lives in Hinsdale

Olympic sports 

 Frank Foss, pole vaulter; Olympic gold medalist (1920); lived and died in Hinsdale
 John Kinsella, swimmer; Olympic gold medalist in 4 x 200 metre freestyle relay (1972)
 Edwin Myers, pole vaulter; Olympic bronze medalist (1920); born in Hinsdale 
 Courtney Zablocki, Olympic luger

Soccer 

 Andrew Gutman, defender for Atlanta United
 Matt Pyzdrowski, goalkeeper for the Chicago Fire Premier, Portland Timbers and Ängelholms FF (Sweden)

Sports management  

 James Delany, commissioner of the Big Ten Conference
 Mike Bohn, athletic director, currently for the University of Southern California

Tennis 

 Todd Martin, tennis player; born in Hinsdale
 Marty Riessen, tennis player; born in Hinsdale
 Caroline Dolehide, tennis player; born in Hinsdale

References

Hinsdale
Hinsdale